Nicolas Cesbron is a French artist. He was born in Reims, in Champagne, France. His work has been referred to as "the new Art Nouveau," walking the line between woodwork and sculpture. In an interview, he explained, "the objects I have carved a soul beyond the functionality."
 
Cesbron's studio is a remodeled ironworks space, at Saint Denis between Fort de Briche et le Boulevard Périphérique in Paris. He has shown his work in Barcelona, Brussels, Paris, and cities throughout Germany. A sculptural wooden staircase he created is installed in the Christian Louboutin Ginza boutique in Tokyo.

He was interested in woodworking as a child, but under pressure from his parents, studied physics instead. He went on to teach at a university in the Ivory Coast in West Africa where, in his spare time, he became interested in the African art of wood-carving. Thereafter, he returned to France and earned his Ph.D. in physics at a university there while developing his own woodworking skills. 
 
Cesbron had his first major art exhibition in 1994 at the Musée de l'Orangerie in the center of Paris. It aroused a great deal of attention and after another year as a physicist at the university, he turned to art as a profession.

References

Year of birth missing (living people)
Living people
Artists from Reims
20th-century French sculptors
French male sculptors
21st-century French sculptors
21st-century French male artists